Glyphipterix scolias is a species of sedge moth in the genus Glyphipterix. It was described by Edward Meyrick in 1910. It is found on the Kermadec Islands.

References

Moths described in 1910
Glyphipterigidae
Moths of New Zealand